William Thomas Bailey (September 22, 1842 - March 31, 1914) was a 19th and 20th century lumberman from Duluth, Minnesota.

Early life
W. T. Bailey was born in Baylysboro, Ontario on September 22, 1842 to James Joseph and Catherine C. Bailey of England (James) and Canada (Catherine). After gold was discovered in California, James Joseph set out in search of gold and was never heard from again. It is believed he met a violent end.

By the age of 10, William Thomas was an orphan. Bailey took a job in the railroad industry to support himself, which he became the purchasing agent for Northwestern Railroad which was headquartered in Chicago, Illinois.

Business career

In the 1880s, Bailey migrated to Duluth, Minnesota in which his skills as an organizer and businessmen enabled him to start up in a new enterprise, lumber. While corporate offices remained in Duluth, Bailey's company logged extensively in northeastern Minnesota. His mill was found in Virginia, Minnesota, where his son Richard Robert Bailey had local headquarters since 1896.

He started his lumber mill in 1897 on Virginia Lake (also known as Bailey's Lake) in Virginia, MN. The lake adjacent to Bailey's Lake is Silver Lake, upon whose shore was the largest white pine mill in the world at its time. This mill was the Virginia and Rainy Lake Lumber Company and was a totally different enterprise and had no relationship to the Baileys. Production of this mill was approximately one million board feet of white pine lumber per day. There is a statue dedicated to the logging, lumbering, and mining industries on the shore of Silver Lake.  Bailey's old residence still stands today at 816 5th Avenue South, across the street from the old Coates residence (Coates who owned the Coates Hotel in Virginia).

Between William T. Bailey company and Dan H. Moon's company (Moon & Kerr Lumber Co.), it caused the first major economic and population boom of white settlers, businessmen, and pioneers. Before Leonidas Merritt discovered iron deposits in Mt. Iron, the Iron Range main economic force was lumber. After iron was discovered, the lumber industry received ample amount of business from the mines, thus solidifying Bailey's sawmill as one of the major catalysts of industry to happen in Virginia, Minnesota.

Bailey's son R. R. Bailey owned 97% of the stock in Bailey's company until it was divided amongst W. T. Bailey & his wife, his other son, and his other daughter (R. R. Bailey's brother, sister, and mother). Bailey's lumber company would remain as a business until 1951 when it was reorganized as Bailey's Town Pump.

The main sawmill closed in 1923. A small resaw mill operated on the same property until the early 1950s (still by the Bailey Corporation) when others bought the retail store and the mill. This then became Pohaki Lumber, which still operates today.

Personal life
On June 25, 1873, William Bailey married Rebecca Roberts of Michigan (daughter of Richard and Rebecca Roberts of Ottawa, Michigan). Richard Roberts was a prominent lumberman himself. Together, William T. Bailey and Rebecca Bailey had three children: William Thomas Jr., Richard Robert, and Rebecca Bailey. All the family members were involved with the lumber mill, and they all held stock within the company.

In 1955, Rebecca (Bailey) Raley (daughter of W. T. Bailey) sued for liquidation of the company claiming that Richard Robert and other officials had fraudulently failed to inform her that the company was being reorganized. She stated the corporation failed; therefore the corporation should have been dissolved and the assets distributed.

Bailey considered himself a Republican that belonged to the Presbyterian Church. He was affiliated with the Masonic Order & local lodge and was a member of the Independent Order of the Odd Fellows. He was a man deeply devoted to home and family.

Death
William T. Bailey died on Tuesday, March 31, 1914, at 10 a.m. CST in Rochester, Minnesota the age of 72. The Virginia Enterprise (now known as The Mesabi Daily News) reported on that day that W.T. had died due to surgical complication after undergoing kidney surgery for acute kidney problems.

W. T. had gone to meet with Dr. William James Mayo and Dr. Charles Horace Mayo of the Mayo Clinic in Rochester, Minnesota a few weeks prior to the operation. After the operation, William's health declined quickly and was declared dead the following morning.

The funeral was set to be held at the family home at 1317 East 1st Street, Duluth, Minnesota on Thursday, April 2, 1914, at 2:00 p.m. CST. Dr. Yost, pastor of the First Presbyterian Church of Duluth presided the event. Honorary pallbearers were Charles d'Autremont, B.F. Smith, A.B. Wolvin, and John Williams. Active pallbearers were Robert Whitesides, Daniel Healy, Frank Smith, Richard M. Sellwood, William Orr, and W. I. Prince. The interment was set for Forest Hill Cemetery in Duluth.

Legacy & honors
 Bailey's Lake - One of two lakes in Virginia, Minnesota. It was named after William T. Bailey as his sawmill was on the north shore of the lake. Bailey's Lake has a dock that extends halfway into the lake which is a popular destination for those walking around the lake, in town fishing. The walkway around the lake is paved and equivalent to approximately one mile. Bailey's Lake and Silver Lake are connected by The East Two River which runs through both lakes and beyond.

References

 The Virginia Enterprise (Mesabi Daily News) Tuesday, March 31, 1914 pg. 1
 http://zenithcity.com/zenith-city-history-archives/biography/bailey-william-t/
 https://libarchive.d.umn.edu/?p=creators/creator&id=678

People from Virginia, Minnesota
People from Duluth, Minnesota
1842 births
1914 deaths
American loggers